Dhafer L'Abidine (also spelt Dhaffer L'Abidine, Zafer El-Abedin and Dhafer El Abidine; born 26 November 1972) is a Tunisian actor and former professional football player.

Biography 
Dhafer made his acting debut in the UK after graduating from Birmingham School of Acting. He starred in Sky One's Dream Team, BBC's Spooks and ITV's The Bill. He also starred in "The Mark of Cain" as Omar Abdullah and in A Hologram for the King. He became famous in Tunisia after he played the role of "Dali" in a Tunisian series called "Maktoub". He later went on to participate in dramas in the Arab world, notably in Egypt, the UAE and Lebanon including shows and series such as "Taht Al Saytara", "Prince of Poets", and "Arous Beirut"

Film

Mark of Cain
Children of Men (2006)
The Da Vinci Code (2006)
The Gems Merchant
The Hunt Feast
Marie la Fille de Son
Le Rendez-Vous
Sex and the City 2 (2010)
A Hologram for the King (2016)
Abu Shanab
Habet Caramel
asbet alf lila wa lila

Television

Hunted (2012)
Benidorm (as Mohammed) (from Series 5, March 2012)
Casualty (from Series 26, September 2011)
Spooks 5 (episode 6&7)
Prince of Poets (presenter, 2007)
Voyages of Discovery
The Message
The Bill
Doctors (BBC, 2005)
Bombshell Ramon Jim Loach Shed Productions
Brothers Kais (Regular) Hamadi Arafa RTT Tunisia
 2009 - 2013 : Tunis 2050 : Bilel
Dream Team (2 series) Marcel Sabatier (Regular) Various Sky Television
Wire in the Blood 2
First Love
Maktoub (4 Saisons) (as Dali Naji) (Prod. Cactus Of Sami Fehri RTT Tunisia)
Vertigo (Egyptian Ramadan 2012 series)
The Bible - Uriah the Hittite
Niran Sadiqa (Egyptian ... Ramadan 2013 series)
The Cube (Dubai TV, 2014)
Transporter: The Series
 Elsaytara (Egyptian Ramadan 2015 series)
Al khourouj - The Exit (Egyptian Ramadan 2016 series) 
Halawet el Donia (Egyptian Ramadan 2017 series)
Caramel (Ramadan 2017 series)
eugenie nights (Ramadan 2018 series)
The Looming Tower (miniseries) (2018 Hulu Network)
Arous Beirut (2019 series)

References

External links

Living people
1972 births
Tunisian footballers
Tunisian male television actors
Tunisian male film actors
20th-century Tunisian male actors
21st-century Tunisian male actors
People from Tunis

Association footballers not categorized by position